Bull Durham may refer to:

 Bull Durham, a 1988 American film
 Bull Durham (pitcher) (1877–1960), American baseball pitcher
 Ed Durham (1907–1976), American baseball pitcher nicknamed "Bull"
 Leon Durham (born 1957), American baseball first baseman nicknamed "Bull"
 Bull Durham Smoking Tobacco

See also
 Bull Durham Sacks & Railroad Tracks
 Bull Durham Tobacco Factory
 Durham Bulls